Lyman G. Parratt (May 17, 1908 - June 29, 1995) was an American physicist. He is known for various research using x-rays.

Parratt was born in Salt Lake City.

In 1954, Parratt used x-rays to explore the surface of copper-coated glass, thereby creating the field of X-ray reflectometry.

He died in Redmond, Oregon, aged 87.

See also

Günther Porod, Austrian x-ray physicist with somewhat similar name.

References

1908 births
1995 deaths
20th-century American physicists
People from Salt Lake City
Fellows of the American Physical Society